Aechmea werdermannii is a plant species in the genus Aechmea. This species is endemic to eastern Brazil, known from the States of Pernambuco and Alagoas.

References

werdermannii
Endemic flora of Brazil
Plants described in 1935